Bykle is a municipality in Agder county, Norway. It is located in the traditional district of Setesdal. The administrative centre of the municipality is the village of Bykle. Other villages in Bykle municipality include Berdalen, Bjåen, Breive, Hoslemo, Hovden, and Nordbygdi. Bykle was established as a municipality on 1 January 1902 when it was separated from the municipality of Valle.

The  municipality is the 60th largest by area out of the 356 municipalities in Norway. Bykle is the 337th most populous municipality in Norway with a population of 935.

General information

The municipality of Bykle was created when it was separated from the older municipality of Valle on 1 January 1902 after a dispute over the costs of road building (Bykle was the bigger area, while Valle had more people and more money).  Initially, Bykle had a population of 476 residents in the new municipality. The boundaries of the municipality have not changed since that time.

Name
The municipality (originally the parish) is named after the old Byklum farm, since the first Bykle Church was built there. The farm is named after Lake Bykil, but the meaning of that name is unknown. Historically, the name has been spelled Bøgle or Bøckle, but the spelling has been Bykle since the 19th century.

Coat of arms
The coat of arms was granted on 4 April 1986. The official blazon is "Vert, goutte d'eau". This means the arms have a green field (background) and the charge is droplets of water that are equally spaced all over the shield. The water droplets have a tincture of argent which means they are commonly colored white, but if it is made out of metal, then silver is used. The green color in the field symbolizes the importance of agriculture in the municipality. The water droplets were chosen as a symbol for the water and rivers in the municipality, as well as for the hydropower plant which was founded in 1915. The plant has brought prosperity to the area since then. The arms were designed by Daniel Rike.

Churches
The Church of Norway has one parish within the municipality of Bykle. It is part of the Otredal prosti (deanery) in the Diocese of Agder og Telemark.

Geography
Bykle sits in the northern part of the Setesdalen valley. It is bordered to the north by Vinje municipality and to the east by Tokke municipality both of which are in Vestfold og Telemark county. It is bordered to the south by Valle and Sirdal municipality, both in Agder county. It is bordered in the southwest by Sandnes municipality and in the west by Hjelmeland and Suldal municipalities–all in Rogaland county.

There are many lakes that are located within the mountainous municipality including Blåsjø, Botsvatn, Hartevatnet, Holmavatnet, Ormsavatnet, Reinevatn, Skyvatn, Store Urevatn, Svartevatnet, and Vatndalsvatnet, and Ytre Storevatnet.

The Byklestigen pass is a torturous trail up a steep cliff face. Until the 1870s, it was the only route to reach Bykle from the middle Setesdal valley to the south. It runs above the river Otra and was the site of numerous accidents on the hazardous route. The eastern side of the valley (and the municipal/county border) is lined by the mountains Gråsteinsnosi, Brandsnutene, Svolhusgreini, Sæbyggjenuten, and Støylsdalsnutene. The western side of the valley (and the municipal/county border) is lined by the mountains Storhellernuten, Skyvassnuten, Sveigen, and Kaldafjellet. The southern border of the municipality is marked by the mountain Steinheii. The mountains Urevassnutene, Djuptjønnuten, Snjoheinuten, and Kvervetjønnuten mark the highlands in the southwestern part of the municipality, northwest of the village of Bykle.

Climate

Economy
Bykle has several hydroelectric power generation facilities. The second-largest sector of income for Bykle is the alpine skiing facility in Hovden. Due to its vast amount of hydroelectric power, Bykle is now the wealthiest of the municipalities in Setesdal.

Government
All municipalities in Norway, including Bykle, are responsible for primary education (through 10th grade), outpatient health services, senior citizen services, unemployment and other social services, zoning, economic development, and municipal roads. The municipality is governed by a municipal council of elected representatives, which in turn elect a mayor.  The municipality falls under the Agder District Court and the Agder Court of Appeal.

Municipal council
The municipal council of Bykle is made up of 13 representatives that are elected to four year terms. Currently, the party breakdown is as follows:

Politics
Bykle has been run by one mayor, Kai Jeiskelid, from 1985 until 2011. In September 2011, a new mayor was elected: Jon-Rolf Næss. Due to a law implemented for 50 years ago by the Labour Party, the obligation of politicians' residence in this municipality is required.

History
At Storhedder, north of the lake Storheddervatnet near the mountain Storheddernuten, there are prehistoric runic inscriptions dating over 1000 years old.

The Hovden area was interconnected more with the districts to the west of the mountains than communities further down the Setesdal valley. The main mountain plateau trade route led west to Suldal municipality in Rogaland. The Byklestigen pass was the line of divisions between dialects; in Valle to the south the classic Setesdal tongue was spoken while in Bykle the dialect includes a significant mixture from neighboring Telemark county.

Falcons were trapped in the heights above Bykle. From as early as 1203 and as late as 1780 there are reports of English and Dutch trapping of falcons at Breivik in Bykle. One byproduct of the numerous Dutch visits in the 1560s was the discovery that the natives had no natural resistance to syphilis; a state physician had to be dispatched there to stem the disease.

Attractions
 Old Bykle Church, built in 1619, is found in the village of Bykle. It stands on the site of an older stave church
 Open air museums at Huldreheimen and Lislestog.
 Hovden ski resort and village is found in the north along Norwegian National Road 9.
 Viking Age bog iron museum, which recognizes the industry in the area over 1000 years ago, located at Hovden
 Prehistoric runic inscriptions at Storhedder

Notable people 
 Tore Segelcke (1901–1979) a Norwegian actress, with husband, Anton Raabe, she bought and restored Huldreheimen in Bykle

References

External links

Municipal fact sheet from Statistics Norway 
Visiting Bykle and Hovden 
Municipal website 

 
Setesdal
Municipalities of Agder
1902 establishments in Norway